The Shock of the Old is a book written by the British historian David Edgerton and published in 2006. 

In The Shock of the Old, Edgerton points out that invention is not the same as implementation, and when technology is discussed as a historical subject undue emphasis is placed on initial invention, which Edgerton defines as the moment someone first has the idea for a particular device or concept, and innovation, which Edgerton defines as the first utilisation of a particular technology. 

Edgerton advocates viewing technological history in terms of objects, which have a tangible and personal effect on the lives of individuals, rather than vague concepts of what any particular technology actually is. 

The book's title paraphrases the 1980 television series The Shock of the New.

References

External links
 The Shock of the Old reviewed at The Guardian Unlimited website.

2006 books
History books about scientific discoveries
History of inventions
Technology books
Works about the history of industries